The Kara Strait or Kara Gates is a  wide channel of water between the southern end of Novaya Zemlya and the northern tip of Vaygach Island. This strait connects the Kara Sea and the Barents Sea in northern Russia.

The Kara Strait was an important waterway in the early exploration of the Northern Sea Route.

Straits of Russia
Bodies of water of the Barents Sea
Straits of the Kara Sea